The men's 100 metre breaststroke event at the 2018 Commonwealth Games was held on 6 and 7 April at the Gold Coast Aquatic Centre.

Records
Prior to this competition, the existing world, Commonwealth and Games records were as follows:

The following records were established during the competition:

Results

Heats
The heats were held on 6 April at 11:00.

Semifinals
The semifinals were held on 6 April at 20:32.

Semifinal 1

Semifinal 2

Final
The final was held on 7 April at 19:48.

References

Men's 100 metre breaststroke
Commonwealth Games